Wyoming Highway 159 (WYO 159) is a  north-south Wyoming State Road located in east-central Goshen County and travels north of Torrington.

Route description
Wyoming Highway 159 begins at US 26/US 85 (Valley Road W.) and from there travels north through the western parts of Torrington named W. C Street
. The first  through the city is maintained by the city of Torrington.  State maintenance begins at Milepost 0.45. WYO 159 reaches the city limits at 1.43 miles. Just north of Torrington, at approximately 2.6 miles, WYO 159 turns west but back north again a mile later.
Highway 159 crosses the Interstate Canal afterward, which provides water for farmland irrigation that comes from the Whalen Diversion Dam near Fort Laramie. For the remaining miles north of the canal, WYO 159 travels through prairie land till its end at Milepost 12.78 at an intersection with Goshen CR 233.

Major intersections

References

Official 2003 State Highway Map of Wyoming

External links 

Wyoming State Routes 100-199
WYO 159 - US 26/US 87 to Goshen CR 47
City of Torrington website

Transportation in Goshen County, Wyoming
159